Kakunj is a village in the former administrative unit of Baldushk in Tirana District, Albania. At the 2015 local government reform it became part of the municipality Tirana. Kakunj is famous for its waterfall called the waterfall of Kakunja (alb: Ujëvara e Kakunjes) or as the local people call it, the waterfall of Askolaj (Askolaj is the name of the geographical location where the waterfall is located. The village has a very panoramic view surrounded by low level hills and it is suitable for people that love nature and hiking. It also has bars and a restaurant "Kakunje e Vjeter Restaurant" where your can try some local dishes. {
  "type": "FeatureCollection",
  "features": [
    {
      "type": "Feature",
      "properties": {},
      "geometry": {
        "type": "Polygon",
        "coordinates": [
          [
            [
              19.85611438751221,
              41.16062771638701
            ],
            [
              19.85611438751221,
              41.16062771638701
            ],
            [
              19.85611438751221,
              41.16062771638701
            ],
            [
              19.85611438751221,
              41.16062771638701
            ]
          ]
        ]
      }
    }
  ]
}

References

Populated places in Tirana
Villages in Tirana County